Chimgi-Tura or Chingi-Tura (Siberian Tatar: Цемке-тора) was a medieval city of the Siberian Tatars in 12th-16th centuries located in Western Siberia.

It was a capital of the Khanate of Sibir until the early 16th century, when its ruler Khan Muhammad decided not to remain at Chimgi-Tura, and chose a new capital named Qashliq located on the Irtysh.

After the Cossack ataman Yermak from Muscovy conquered the Siberian Khanate in the 1580s, the city of Chimgi-Tura was abandoned or burned. In 1586 the Russian fort Tyumen was built nearby. Modern Tyumen, one of the centres of the Russian oil industry, covers the site where Chimgi-Tura used to stand.

References

Geography of Tyumen Oblast
Defunct towns in Russia
Former populated places in Russia
Khanate of Sibir
Cultural heritage monuments in Tyumen Oblast